Jaimee Fourlis (born 17 September 1999) is a professional Australian tennis player of Greek descent. She has a career-high singles ranking of world No. 147, achieved on 18 July 2022, and a highest doubles ranking of world No. 138, reached on 2 March 2020. She has won eight ITF singles titles and five ITF doubles titles.

On the ITF Junior Circuit, Fourlis reached a career-high combined ranking of 38, achieved in February 2016. She reached the girls' doubles semifinals of the 2016 Australian Open, partnering with Maddison Inglis.

Fourlis made her Grand Slam main-draw debut after winning the 2017 Australian Open Wildcard Playoff by defeating Abbie Myers in the final, earning her a wildcard into the 2017 Australian Open singles tournament.

Personal Info
She grew up in Melbourne and attended Northcote High School. Her family comes from Agrinio and Thessaloniki, Greece. Her Greek Orthodox name is Dimitra.

Career

2014–2016: The beginnings
Fourlis made her ITF Women's Circuit debut in Glen Iris in March 2014. Her first win came in October 2014 in Cairns when her opponent Carolin Daniels retired while down 0–3.

In March 2015, she qualified for the Melbourne ITF event and made the semifinal. She played two more ITF tournaments in Croatia for the year.

In 2016, Fourlis commenced the year at the Perth $25k event, where from qualifying she won eight matches en route to her first title. She played a number of events across Australia and Great Britain, with limited success. She ended the 2016 season with a ranking of 427.

2017: Grand Slam debut
Fourlis was given a wildcard into the Hobart International where she lost to Kirsten Flipkens in the opening round.
She made her Grand Slam debut at the Australian Open, after winning the Wildcard Playoff. She defeated Anna Tatishvili before losing to Svetlana Kuznetsova in the second round. In February and March, Fourlis competed on the Australian ITF Circuit, reaching the quarterfinals in Launceston. In May, she competed in Wiesbaden, before winning an Australian wildcard playoff into the French Open, losing to former world No. 1 Caroline Wozniacki in three sets. After the French Open, Fourlis took three months off to focus on her Year 12 studies, returning to the Australian ITF Circuit in September, where she reached the quarterfinals in both Penrith and Brisbane. In December, Fourlis won the Under-18 Australian Championships and received a main draw wildcard to the 2018 Australian Open.

2018: Top 200 debut
Fourlis was given a wildcard into the Hobart International where she defeated Nina Stojanović, before losing to Heather Watson in the second round. At the Australian Open, she received a wildcard but lost to Olivia Rogowska in the first round. 

In April, Fourlis won her second and third ITF titles. In June, her ranking peaked inside the world's top 200. She ended 2018 with a singles ranking of 202.

2019–2020 
In January 2019, Fourlis lost in the first round of qualifying for the Australian Open. She spent the next months of 2019 on the ITF Circuit with her best result being a semifinal result in Rome in May 2019 and Barcelona in June 2019.
In July 2019, she qualified for the WTA Tour events in Bucharest and Palermo.
Fourlis reached the final round of the US Open qualifying. She ended 2019 with a singles ranking of 248.

Following a first-round loss in Perth in March 2020, she underwent shoulder surgery.

2021: Return from surgery
In August 2021, Fourlis won her fourth ITF tournament. It was her first after returning to tour in June 2021, and her first singles title in three years. Fourlis lost in the first round of the US Open qualifying.

2022: Australian Open mixed doubles finalist, top 150 debut
In January, Fourlis reached the second round of the Australian Open qualifying. At the same tournament as a wildcard pair, she reached the final in the mixed doubles event, partnering Jason Kubler which they lost to fifth seeds Kristina Mladenovic and Ivan Dodig.

On 27 June, she reached top 150 before the Wimbledon Championships where she qualified, making her main-draw debut at this major.

2023: Third Australian Open wildcard

Performance timelines
Only main-draw results in WTA Tour, Grand Slam tournaments, Fed Cup/Billie Jean King Cup and Olympic Games are included in win–loss records.

Singles
Current after the 2023 Australian Open.

Mixed doubles

Grand Slam tournament finals

Mixed doubles: 1 (runner-up)

ITF Circuit finals

Singles: 9 (8 titles, 1 runner-up)

Doubles: 15 (5 titles, 10 runner–ups)

Playing style
Fourlis is an offensive baseliner and has a powerful forehand which she uses to try to dictate play from the back of the court. Her backhand and serve are reliable. She covers the court well. When she plays, she looks to use her forehand to finish off points.

Notes

References

External links
 
 
 

1999 births
Living people
Australian female tennis players
Tennis players from Melbourne
Australian people of Greek descent